Contra: Rogue Corps is a run and gun video game in the Contra series developed by Toylogic and published by Konami. It was released on September 24, 2019 for Nintendo Switch, PlayStation 4, Windows, and Xbox One.

Rogue Corps is set in the fictional Damned City two years after Contra III: The Alien Wars and Contra 4, featuring four playable characters and a wide degree of weapon customization. The game received generally mixed reviews upon release. It was criticized for its gameplay, graphics, and story, although praise fell toward its upgrade and customization system.

Plot
The story is set several years after that of Contra III: The Alien Wars, taking place in Damned City. Due to the catastrophic events of the Alien Wars, Damned City has now become a post-apocalyptic environment that is home to "all sorts of strange artifacts and tech". The harsh environment causes incurable psychic damage to the minds of human beings, driving them insane. The city has a mysterious gate that unleashes hideous Fiends, attacking anything that is alive.

Players assume the roles of four former military mercs, scrappers, and bounty hunters who are known as the Jaegers: Kaiser, a rebuilt cyborg from The Alien Wars; Ms. Harakiri, an assassin with a parasitic alien attached; The Gentleman, a well-cultured, highly intelligent alien bug; and Hungry Beast, a brilliantly scientific cyborg giant panda. Naturally immune to the mind-destroying effects of the city, the Jaegers are humanity's hope against the threat of the Fiends.

Gameplay
The gameplay utilizes a top-down isometric view similar to Neo Contra. The gameplay modes are single-player story campaign, multiplayer online cooperative, and four-player local cooperative (with separate Switch consoles). It is based on player versus environment (PVE) gameplay, with dual analog controller sticks.

Players configure a main weapon and sub-weapon in real time. These have unlimited ammunition, but also a heat meter to be managed. Between stages, weapons are upgraded and uniquely customized. As a last resort, the player can clear the area with a huge bomb or use the character's special ability.

Development
Contra: Rogue Corps was announced at E3 2019. The development of the game was overseen by veteran Contra series director and senior producer Nobuya Nakazato, who also had been director, game designer, and artist of Contra III: The Alien Wars (1992) and Contra: Hard Corps (1994) and was producer and director of Contra: Shattered Soldier (2002) and more. He said he wanted to capture the traditional spirit of the Contra series, while modernizing it for a new audience.

Reception

Contra: Rogue Corps received "mixed or average" reviews on the PlayStation 4 and Xbox One, and received "generally unfavorable" reviews on the Nintendo Switch, according to review aggregator Metacritic. Mitchell Saltzman of IGN attended the E3 2019 preview, initially feeling "some strong initial whiplash" from the dramatic departure from the series' history and the lack of nostalgia. With its "solid foundation" of gameplay, he found "a respectable twin-stick shooter with good gunplay and the potential for a great time with four-player couch co-op". He praised the way the game rewards a player's thoughtful strategies with a "smart and fun dynamic where you'll need to juggle your main and sub-weapon regularly".

Destructoid criticized the use of season pass downloadable content though "nothing of substance is being gated off", and noted that the overall reception by E3 attendees was "incredibly mixed". Nintendo Life criticized its controls, graphics, and "bland" mission structurewhile praising its complex upgrade and customization system. Ben "Yahtzee" Croshaw of Zero Punctuation ranked it as the worst game of 2019, and the third worst game of the entire 2010s decade.

PlayStation LifeStyles review of the game was more positive, stating that it "understands the appeal of revisiting gratuitous 90s cheese, but filters out all the tropes we’ve grown out of since. By injecting actual, creative humor instead of edgy cynicism or boring references, Contra: Rogue Corps really has a personality of its own despite most of the storytelling living in the background."

References

External links
 

2019 video games
Contra (series)
Multiplayer and single-player video games
PlayStation 4 games
Xbox One games
Nintendo Switch games
Windows games
Video games set in the 27th century
PlayStation 4 Pro enhanced games
Xbox One X enhanced games
Konami games
Video games developed in Japan